Ghana are one of Africa's major forces in the Africa Cup of Nations. Ghana made its debut in 1963, Ghana emerged and became a fearsome power of the tournament, winning the tournament again in 1965 and 1978.

The 1982 tournament was the last tournament to date Ghana has won.

References

External links
Africa Cup of Nations – Archives competitions – cafonline.com

 
Ghana national football team